Pentz is a surname. Notable people with the surname include:

Amos Pentz (1849-1922), Canadian shipbuilder
Gene Pentz (born 1953), American baseball player
Ivan Pentz (born 1957), South African rower
Mike Pentz (1924-1995), South African physicist
Patrick Pentz (born 1997), Austrian goalkeeper
Thomas Pentz (born 1978), American DJ and music producer